Greta Small (born 16 October 1995) is an Australian alpine ski racer. She started skiing at Mt Hotham with the Mount Hotham Racing Squad; her main training base now is in the Tyrol region in Austria where she trains with Race Centre Benni Raich. Her first major international appearance was at the Innsbruck 2012 Youth Olympic Games. In Small's first senior World championships she placed 25th in the Super Combined at 17 years of age. The 2013–14 Northern Hemisphere winter was a first of many things for Small. She competed at the Solden opening World Cup Giant Slalom followed by three World Cup events in Beaver Creek, Colorado, and the 2014 Winter Olympics in Sochi, Russia. Small placed 15th in the Alpine Combined which was Australia's best placing for 12 years and she was  the second-youngest in the field by 8 days.

At the end of the 2015 season whilst racing in Japan, Small tore her ACL.

World Cup results

Season standings

World Championship results

Olympic results

References

External links

1995 births
Australian female alpine skiers
Alpine skiers at the 2014 Winter Olympics
Alpine skiers at the 2018 Winter Olympics
Alpine skiers at the 2022 Winter Olympics
Olympic alpine skiers of Australia
People from Wangaratta
Living people
Alpine skiers at the 2012 Winter Youth Olympics
21st-century Australian women